The 1990 Chicago Marathon was the 13th running of the annual marathon race in Chicago, United States and was held on October 28. The elite men's race was won by Mexico's Martín Pitayo in a time of 2:09:41 hours and the women's race was won by Portugal's Aurora Cunha in 2:30:11.

Results

Men

Women

References

Results. Association of Road Racing Statisticians. Retrieved 2020-04-10.

External links 
 Official website

Chicago Marathon
Chicago
1990 in Illinois
1990s in Chicago
Chicago Marathon
Chicago Marathon